Between Heaven and Earth is an album by trombonist Conrad Bauer, bassist Peter Kowald, and drummer Günter Sommer. It was recorded on November 30 and December 1, 2001, at Radio Studio DRS in Zürich, and was released in 2003 by Intakt Records.

This was the trio's final recording, as Kowald died unexpectedly in September 2002. Sommer reflected: "For thirty years, this friendship to Peter Kowald enriched my life... He did not only show me vast parts of the world, but through him I understood what keeps us moving, in the end, is the ability to do something with desire and love, to love something!"

Reception

In a review for AllMusic, Steve Loewy stated that the album "captures the trio at its best, with intensely swirling layers of sound interlaced with innovative, creative improvisations." He concluded: "An important album for aesthetic and historic reasons, Between Heaven and Earth is a reminder of how compelling this trio could be."

The authors of The Penguin Guide to Jazz Recordings awarded the album a full 4 stars, and wrote: "Bauer is the dominant voice, but both Kowald and Sommer are so attuned to this idiom that one hears a group rather than individuals... a further poignant footnote to the magnificent career of Europe's most influential free-jazz bassist."

Track listing
Composed by Conrad Bauer, Günter Sommer, and Peter Kowald.

 "Being Born" – 3:30
 "Wondering" – 6:36
 "Waiting For" – 4:19
 "Fighting" – 3:01
 "Looking Out" – 4:02
 "Travelling" – 3:15
 "Loving" – 4:21
 "Suffering" – 2:18
 "Playing" – 7:04
 "And Playing Again" – 10:27
 "Travelling Again" – 3:08

Personnel 
 Conrad Bauer – trombone
 Peter Kowald – bass
 Günter Sommer – drums, percussion

References

2003 albums
Intakt Records albums
Peter Kowald albums
Günter Sommer albums